Tom Clancy's Rainbow Six: Critical Hour is the fifth game in the Rainbow Six series, and was released March 14, 2006.

Critical Hour received a mixed reception due to its relatively small amount of content, although it was praised for following the roots of the first games, unlike Lockdown. Following poor sales its planned later release in Europe was canceled, as well as a port of the game for the PlayStation 2.

Storyline
In Critical Hour, John Clark is retiring and passing the leadership of Team Rainbow on to Domingo "Ding" Chavez.  He reminisces on the past missions of Team Rainbow.  While cleaning out his office, he remembers seven missions from his years as the head of Team Rainbow.  He leaves these missions for future members of Team Rainbow to study and to use for training.

Gameplay
Critical Hour goes back to the more realistic tactical formula seen in previous Rainbow Six games (before Lockdown), and also features nonlinear levels. Classic weapons return to Critical Hour from the previous Rainbow Six games, as well as the tactical map from previous games. Overall, the game returns to the classic gameplay from the original Rainbow Six and Rogue Spear by removing the Run and Gun element that was seen in Lockdown. Accuracy for the 20+ weapons is also affected by injuries and running.

Multiplayer
There are eight new multiplayer maps for Critical Hour, with 18 maps in all. The gametypes include the standard Rainbow Six gametypes, plus an assassin mode, sharpshooter, and last man standing. There is also a new skill for every PEC character type - 4 new total - and players can now have up to four PEC characters stored on one gamertag.

Reception

Critical Hour was met with very mixed reception, as GameRankings gave it a score of 56.58%, while Metacritic gave it 54 out of 100.

References

External links
Official Rainbow Six website

2006 video games
 05
Xbox games
Xbox-only games
Cancelled PlayStation 2 games
Cooperative video games
North America-exclusive video games
Tactical shooter video games
Video games developed in Canada
Video games developed in the United States
Video games scored by Bill Brown
Ubisoft games
Tom Clancy games